Barbara Epstein ( Zimmerman; August 30, 1928 – June 16, 2006) was a literary editor and founding co-editor of The New York Review of Books.

Life and work
Epstein, née Zimmerman, was born in Boston, Massachusetts, to a Jewish family, and graduated from Radcliffe College in 1949. In 1953, she and editor Jason Epstein began a marriage that lasted 37 years.

Epstein rose to prominence as the editor at Doubleday of Anne Frank's The Diary of a Young Girl, among other books. She next worked at Dutton, McGraw-Hill, and the Partisan Review.

During the New York newspaper strike of 1963, Barbara and Jason Epstein, together with friends Robert Lowell and Elizabeth Hardwick, founded the biweekly magazine The New York Review of Books, which Barbara called "the paper". She and Robert B. Silvers became the editors. Barbara Epstein remained at the New York Review of Books as an editor for 43 years.

The Epsteins divorced in 1990; Barbara Epstein lived with journalist Murray Kempton until his death in 1997.  She continued in her editing until shortly before her death.

Epstein died on June 16, 2006, of lung cancer in New York City at age 77.

References

External links
 David Remnick, Postscript: Barbara Epstein, The New Yorker, July 3, 2006 - Obituary.
Obituary, n+1, June 27, 2006

1928 births
2006 deaths
Jewish American writers
Writers from Boston
American publishers (people)
Deaths from lung cancer in New York (state)
Radcliffe College alumni
The New York Review of Books
The New York Review of Books people
American literary editors
20th-century American Jews
21st-century American Jews